Leila Ahmed (born 1940) is an Egyptian-American scholar of Islam. In 1992 she published her book Women and Gender in Islam, which is regarded as a seminal historical analysis of the position of women in Arab Muslim societies. She became the first professor of women's studies in religion at Harvard Divinity School in 1999, and has held the Victor S. Thomas Professor of Divinity chair since 2003. She was later awarded the Victor S. Thomas Research Professor of Divinity in 2020 In 2013, Ahmed received the University of Louisville Grawemeyer Award in Religion for her analysis of the veiling of Muslim women in the United States, in which she described her rejection of her own previous critiques of the veil as sexist in favor of the view that the veil, when voluntarily chosen, is a progressive and feminist act. As such, she now supports Muslim women who advocate for the veil as a symbol of progressivism and feminism, although Ahmed herself does not practice veiling.

Biography 
Born in the Heliopolis district of Cairo to a middle-class Egyptian father and an upper class Turkish mother in 1940, Ahmed's childhood was shaped both by Muslim Egyptian values and the liberal orientation of Egypt's aristocracy under the ancien régime. The Ahmed family became politically ostracized following the Free Officers Movement in 1952. Her father, a civil engineer, was a vocal opponent of Gamal Abdel Nasser's construction of the Aswan High Dam on ecological principles.

She earned her undergraduate and doctorate degrees from University of Cambridge during the 1960s before moving to the United States to teach and write, where she was appointed to professorship in Women's Studies and Near Eastern studies at the University of Massachusetts Amherst, and the position of director in said programs in 1981. A professorship in Women's Studies and Religion at the Harvard Divinity School followed in 1999, where she currently teaches.

Work

A Border Passage (1999) 

In her 1999 memoir A Border Passage, Ahmed describes her multicultural Cairene upbringing and her adult life as an expatriate and an immigrant in Europe and the United States. She tells of how she was introduced to Islam through her grandmother during her childhood, and she came to distinguish it from "official Islam" as practiced and preached by a largely male religious elite. This realization would later form the basis of her first acclaimed book, Women and Gender in Islam (1992), a seminal work on Islamic history, Muslim feminism, and the historical role of women in Islam.

Ahmed speaks of her experience in Europe and the United States as one that was often fraught with tension and confusion as she tried to reconcile her Muslim Egyptian identity with Western values. Faced with racism and anti-Muslim prejudice, and after deconstructing traditionalist male-centered beliefs in her own culture, she set out to dispel equally damaging myths and misconceptions held by the West about Islam and Muslim women. Today, Ahmed is perhaps known most widely for her groundbreaking work on the Islamic view of women and their historical and social status in the Muslim world, particularly for her advocacy for veiling, a practice she formerly opposed as someone who grew up in a secular Egyptian family.

Ahmed has been a strong critic of Arab nationalism in Egypt and the Middle East. She devotes an entire chapter in her autobiography to the question of Arab nationalism, and the political factors and efforts which went into constructing an Arab identity for Egypt after the army's coup d'état. According to Ahmed's research, the idea that Egyptians were "Arab" was virtually unheard of well into the 20th century. She describes Arab nationalism, like many other forms of pan-nationalism, as a type of cultural imperialism. This cultural imperialism eats away at the diversity and cultural creativity of not only the Arabic-speaking national majorities (who often speak widely divergent vernaculars), but also the non-Arabic speaking minorities throughout the Middle East and North Africa.

Women and Gender in Islam (1992) 
In her seminal work, Women and Gender in Islam (1992), Ahmed argues that the oppressive practices to which women in the Middle East are subjected are caused by the prevalence of patriarchal interpretations of Islam rather than Islam itself. She maintains that as Islam evolved, two divergent voices emerged in the religion: 
 An ethical structure that advocates the moral and spiritual equality of all human beings; 
 A hierarchical structure as the basis of male/female relations; a gender-based/sexual hierarchy.

Islamic doctrine developed within an androcentric, misogynist society, that of Abbasid Iraq, the customs of which were largely inherited from the Sasanian Empire after its conquest. This society emphasised and institutionalised the gendered hierarchical voice and silenced the voice of equity and justice. Islam as a religion therefore became a discourse of the politically dominant elite, i.e.; male society. There were early signs of resistance to establishment Islam. For example, the thoughts of Sufi and Qarmatians groups, philosophers such as Ibn al-Arabi and the liberal stance of powerful families and individuals towards their daughters in respect of marriage and education (e.g.; imposing a monogamy clause in marriage contracts or one for providing private education).

Despite such resistance, establishment Islam experienced little serious challenge until early 19th-century colonial encroachment. European colonialisms' remit was essentially economic; however, female emancipation was used as an argument to legitimate geopolitical incursion. Colonial feminism was a Western discourse of dominance which, "introduced the notion that an intrinsic connection existed between the issue of culture and the status of women, and … that progress for women could be achieved only through abandoning the native culture."

Inevitably, the initial reaction to this was a rejection of Western values by political Islamists. This rejection saw the conflation of Islam and culture where Islamic authenticity became defined in terms of cultural authenticity and, specifically, the role of women within Islam. This led to a reaffirmation of indigenous customs relating to women and restoration of the customs and laws of past Islamic societies. The underlying assumption was that there is an authentic interpretation of Islam that is based on the texts and institutions developed in Abbasid Iraq. According to such assumptions, the meaning of gender and the position of women within Islam is "unambiguous and ascertainable in some precise and absolute sense."

Since this initial reaction, Muslim women scholars have argued that the values of the Abbasid era in Iraq are not universal to Islam — rather they were specific to a particular time, culture and people. Islamic texts and institutions need to be separated from patriarchal culture and reappraised in terms of merit, and listening to the voice of equality and justice. Ahmed concludes by exhorting feminists, both Muslim and Western, to undertake this task by critically engaging with, challenging and redefining the Middle East regions' diverse religious and cultural heritage.

Bibliography

Books and book chapters
 Edward W. Lane: A study of his life and works and of British ideas of the Middle East in the Nineteenth century. London: Longman (1978)
 "A Traditional Ceremony in an Islamic Milieu in Malaysia", in Muslim Women (1984)
 "Between Two Worlds: The Formation of a Turn-of-the-Century Egyptian Feminist", in Life/Lines: Theorizing Women's Autobiography (1988)
 "Arab Women: 1995", in The Next Arab Decade: Alternative Futures (1988)
 "Feminism and Cross-Cultural Inquiry: The terms of discourse in Islam" In Coming to Terms: Feminism, Theory and Politics. Ed. Elizabeth Weed. New York: Routledge (1989)
 Women and Gender in Islam: Historical Roots of a Modern Debate. New Haven: Yale University Press (1992)
 A Border Passage: From Cairo to America—A Woman's Journey. New York: Farrar Straus & Giroux (1999)
 A Quiet Revolution: The Veil's Resurgence, from the Middle East to America. New Haven. Yale University Press (2011)

Articles
 "Women in the rise of Islam." The new Voices of Islam : Rethinking Politics and Modernity : a Reader. Ed. Mehran Kamrava. Berkeley, CA: University of California Press, 2006. 177-200.
 "The Discourse of the Veil." Post Colonialisms: an Anthology of Cultural Theory and Criticism. Ed. Gaurav Desai and Supriya Nair. New Brunswick, NJ: Rutgers University Press, 2005. 315-338.
 "The Veil Debate Again: a View from America in the Early Twenty-first Century". On Shifting Ground: Muslim Women in the Global Era. Ed. Fereshteh Nourale-Simone. New York: Feminist Press at the City University of New York, 2005.
 "Gender and literacy in Islam." Nothing Sacred: Women Respond to Religious Fundamentalism and Terror. Ed. Betsy Reed. New York: Thunder's Mouth Press/Nation Books, 2002.
 "The Women of Islam". Transition 83 (2000): 78-97.
 "Early Islam and the position of Women: the problem of interpretation." Women in Middle Eastern History: Shifting Boundaries in Sex and Gender. Ed. Nikki R. Keddie, Beth Baron. New Haven: Yale University Press, 1993.
 "Arab Culture and Writing Woman's Bodies." Gender Issues 9.1 (March 1, 1989): 41-55.
 "Women and the Advent of Islam." Signs 11.4 (Summer, 1986): 665-691.
 "Feminism and Feminist Movements in the Middle East, a Preliminary Exploration: Turkey, Egypt, Algeria, People's Democratic Republic of Yemen." Women and Islam. Ed. Ellen Skinner. Virginia: Pergamon Press: 1982. 153.
 "Western Ethnocentrism and Perceptions of the Harem." Feminist Studies 8.3 (Autumn, 1982): 521-534.
 Ahmed, Leila, Krishna Ahooja-Patel, Charlotte Bunch, Nilufer Cagatay, Ursula Funk, Dafna N. Izraeli, Margaret McIntosh, Helen I. Safa, and Aline K. Wong. "Comments on Tinker's 'A Feminist view of Copenhagen". Signs 6.4 (Summer, 1981): 771-790.
 "Encounter with American Feminism: A Muslim Woman's View of Two Conferences". Women's Studies Newsletter 8.3 (Summer, 1980): 7-9.

Filmography
 Ahmed was an advisor to the award-winning, PBS-broadcast documentary Muhammad: Legacy of a Prophet (2002), produced by Unity Productions Foundation.

References

External links 
Ahmed's faculty profile at Harvard Divinity School
Interview with Ahmed ("Muslim Women and Other Misunderstandings) at On Being (radio show) in December 7, 2006
Professor Leila Ahmed, Ph.D., speaks in the Distinguished Lecture Series March 22, 2010
A Border Passage: From Cairo to America -- A Woman's Journey, Leila Ahmed, New York: Farrar, Straus and Giroux, 1999.
Profile of Leila Ahmed By Julia Lieblich, The Associated Press, August 12, 1999

1940 births
Living people
Critics of Arab nationalism
American feminists
Egyptian scholars 
Egyptian academics
Egyptian emigrants to the United States
Egyptian Islamists
American people of Egyptian descent
Muslim reformers
Egyptian feminists
Feminist studies scholars
University of Massachusetts Amherst faculty
Harvard Divinity School faculty
Neo-Marxism
Egyptian people of Turkish descent
American people of Turkish descent
Proponents of Islamic feminism
Egyptian Muslims
Writers from Cairo
Fellows of Clare Hall, Cambridge
Women scholars of Islam